Eressa paurospila is a moth of the family Erebidae. It was described by Alfred Jefferis Turner in 1922. It is found in Australia.

References

Eressa
Moths described in 1922